Museum Madness is an educational video game for MS-DOS and Macintosh developed by Novotrade for MECC, and was released in 1994. The game is based in an American natural history museum and aims to teach the player many aspects of history such as technology, geology, space, American history, and prehistory. PC Magazine described the game as having kids learn about educational topics (i.e. ecology) while making logical deductions in a series sequence and solving puzzles.

Plot
The game starts in the bedroom of an unnamed American high school teenage boy who is seated at his computer, attempting to access the National Museum Interactive Service System, only to see that it is offline for repair. An interactive robot from the museum named MICK (Museum Interactive Computer Kiosk) appears onscreen and talks to the boy, explaining that the museum is in danger of losing its secrets forever.

The boy appears to have an extraordinary relationship with MICK as he alone understands that MICK can talk back to him, which he uses to learn more about the contents of the museum. MICK recognizes this understanding and thus asks the boy for help to save the museum. MICK explains that the exhibits have come to life and are acting very strangely. He announces his suspicion that a virus has infected the system while the museum was being converted to complete autonomous computer control.

The player takes the role of the boy and enters the museum. Through the game, the boy visits each of the exhibits, solving mysteries and puzzles by talking to the historical characters, rearranging objects, trading objects with characters and generally putting things back the way they were.

The game is educationally-based, and the player learns both from the many museum-like information cards placed throughout the exhibits, as well as from solving the problems in the exhibits themselves. Along the way, the boy is aided by MICK, who follows him through the exhibits, instructs him and gives additional help and advice on request.

Once the 25 exhibits are restored, the virus itself must be destroyed, which is the final puzzle to be solved.

Gameplay
The player begins by entering the museum through the basement, working out the basement door's passcode. The player navigates the way into the Main Hall of the museum by a series of numbered doors with corresponding keys which are to be located in the maze of the basement (this introductory location can be skipped if desired).

Once in the Main Hall, the player must locate some batteries to power MICK, which can be found in one of the museum tour tape players. Additionally, the map of the museum on the wall in the Main Hall is found to be in pieces and needs to be reconstructed in order to continue.

Then the player must choose an exhibit to try to repair, using the museum's map to select one. After attempting to repair an exhibit, the player is returned to the Main Hall to select another exhibit. Not until every single one of the exhibits has been returned to normal can the player progress in the game.

When each of the exhibits have been restored, the player returns to the Main Hall to find MICK missing and a cassette tape in his place on the floor. Using one of the museum tape players from which the batteries used to power MICK were borrowed, the player can listen to the tape (shown as on-screen text), which consists of a message from MICK warning the player to go home; the player decides to follow MICK into the basement and finds him in pieces on a bench in the workshop. Upon reassembling MICK, the player must then access the computer to try to stop the virus by answering general knowledge questions. If the player is successful, the virus self-destructs and the museum is saved, and the game is complete.

Exhibits and objectives
The exhibits in the museum, which can be entered by clicking a box on the map in the Main Hall, and can be revisited if not completed (the user can exit an exhibit at any time and return later), are shown by the map to be split into five sections:

Robots: An out-of-control robot has built itself with stolen parts from the machines in the exhibit, which must be returned.
Computer Technology: The exhibit computer's circuits are messed up, and must be repaired.
Discovery of Radio: The protagonist must help Guglielmo Marconi, Heinrich Hertz, Alexander Graham Bell and Reginald Fessenden with their experiments so they can share their devices and invent the radio.
Energy Technology: The energy sources (polluting and non-polluting) are out of balance, and must be restored to their right values to save the exhibit's ecology.
Simple Machines: An animatronic kangaroo is stuck on a high shelf after destroying the exhibit's machines, and the protagonist must fix them in order to rescue the kangaroo.
How Big is the Universe? - The exhibit's computer simulation screens are jumbled up, so the protagonist must rearrange them.
The Solar System: Five stars in the exhibit are out of place, and must be returned to their right positions.
Rockets and Computers - The protagonist must fix a computer showing the history of rockets, then help a rocket connect with a space station, and navigate a space probe through an asteroid field.
Air-Powered Flight: The giant fan in the exhibit has blown all the aircraft away, including the airship, so the protagonist must clean up the mess and put everything in their right places.
Wright Brothers: The Wright Brothers are having trouble inventing the airplane, so the protagonist must help them.
Transcontinental Railroad - The protagonist must decide whether to help the Central Pacific Railroad or Union Pacific Railroad reach Promontory Point, Utah by unscrambling a railroad map.
Salem Witch Trials: The virus has deleted the proof that Sarah Good, who has been convicted of witchcraft, did not create three specters the other women of Salem Village have seen, so the protagonist must prove it himself.
American Revolutionary War: The virus has scrambled the animatronic George Washington's memories, causing him to support the British oppression instead. The protagonist must find the various documents to convince him otherwise.
Ellis Island: The protagonist is put into the role of the immigrants and must successfully reach the U.S. as well as pass his inspection at Ellis island.
Louisiana Purchase - The protagonist is tasked with helping Thomas Jefferson negotiate with Napoleon Bonaparte to buy the Louisiana Territory for the United States.
Hall of Dinosaurs: The virus has infected the exhibit's assembly computer, scrambling the dinosaur skeletons, so the protagonist must re-assemble them properly.
Ocean Life: The protagonist must fix a leaking sewage pipe to restore the exhibit's marine life.
Hall of Animal Habitats: The animals are missing from their respective habitats and must be returned.
Hall of Ecology - The virus has disrupted the exhibit's food web, and the protagonist must restore balance to it.
The Earth's Geology - The protagonist must unscramble the exhibit's mixed-up geological system.
Prehistoric People: The animatronic woolly mammoth has escaped from its pen, and the protagonist must get the cave people to help lure it back.
The Development of Writing: the protagonist must collect notes from all the writing in the exhibit to help a scribe translate a message left to him by his master.
Knights, Heraldry and Jousting - A medieval jousting tournament is underway, and the protagonist must recruit a knight that can defeat the king's champion to end it.
Galileo's Telescope: Galileo is missing the components of his telescope, so the protagonist has to gather them from the rest of the exhibit.
Industrial Revolution - The protagonist must rebuild the machines in the exhibit.

References

External links

Hint sheet

1994 video games
DOS games
Classic Mac OS games
Children's educational video games
Video games set in museums
Museum educational materials
Video games developed in Hungary
The Learning Company games